Montastruc may refer to several communes in France:

 Montastruc, Lot-et-Garonne
 Montastruc, Hautes-Pyrénées
 Montastruc, Tarn-et-Garonne
 Montastruc-de-Salies, Haute-Garonne
 Montastruc-la-Conseillère, Haute-Garonne
 Montastruc-Savès, Haute-Garonne

See also
Pierre Montastruc (1932–2021), French politician